Margarete "Grete" Heublein (29 January 1908, in Barmen – 2 March 1997, in Wuppertal) was a German track and field athlete who competed in the discus throw, shot put and the 100 metres sprint. She set the world record in discus on 19 June 1932 in Hagen, reaching 40.84 metres, but lost it the same day. She competed at the 1928 Summer Olympics and the 1932 Summer Olympics.

References

1908 births
1997 deaths
Sportspeople from Wuppertal
German female sprinters
German female shot putters
German female discus throwers
Athletes (track and field) at the 1928 Summer Olympics
Athletes (track and field) at the 1932 Summer Olympics
Olympic athletes of Germany
World record setters in athletics (track and field)
Women's World Games medalists
Olympic female sprinters
20th-century German women